Listed below are the longest consecutive games played  in Major League Baseball history.  To compile such a streak, a player must appear in every game played by his team.  The streak is broken if the team completes a game in which the player neither takes a turn at bat nor plays a half-inning in the field.

The record of playing in 2,632 consecutive games over more than 16 years is held by Cal Ripken Jr. of the Baltimore Orioles. Ripken surpassed Lou Gehrig of the New York Yankees, whose record of 2,130 consecutive games had stood for 56 years.  Before Gehrig, the record was held by Everett Scott (1,307 consecutive games), a shortstop with the Red Sox and Yankees whose streak ended in 1925, less than a month before Gehrig's began. Scott broke the previous record which was established by George Pinkney (577 consecutive games) from 1885 to 1890.

The record for a National League player is held by Steve Garvey of the Los Angeles Dodgers and San Diego Padres (1975–1983), though Garvey's 1,207-game streak is less than half the length of Ripken's.  Previous holders of the National League record include Billy Williams of the Chicago Cubs (1963–1970), Stan Musial of the St. Louis Cardinals (1952–1957), and Gus Suhr of the Pittsburgh Pirates (1931–1937).

Of the top 17 streaks on this list, 9 were compiled by members of the Baseball Hall of Fame.  Two others are separate streaks compiled by Pete Rose, who was named one of the top 30 players of the 20th century but is banned from the Hall of Fame.

Key

List

Minimum 500 consecutive games played

Official definition
MLB's rule 10.23(c), defining consecutive game streaks, is as follows: "A consecutive game playing streak shall be extended if the player plays one half inning on defense, or if he completes a time at bat by reaching base or being put out. A pinch running appearance only shall not extend the streak. If a player is ejected from a game by an umpire before he can comply with the requirements of this rule, his streak shall continue."

Thus it is possible for a pinch-runner to enter a game and record a statistic—steal a base, be caught stealing, or score a run—without being credited with a (consecutive) game played. Indeed, Juan Pierre appeared in 821 consecutive games from 2002 to 2007, but on June 3, 2005, he was used solely as a pinch runner.  Under Rule 10.23(c), this resulted in separate games-played streaks of 386 and 434 games.

Similarly, a fielder can field a ball in play, make a putout or an assist, and even commit an error, without being credited with a (consecutive) game played. For example, Hideki Matsui's consecutive games streak was ended when he broke his wrist diving for a ball with two outs in the first inning of the Yankee game of May 11, 2006. That game would have been #519 in his MLB streak and #1,769 in his MLB/Japan game streak (see below), but since Matsui did not play a full half inning on defense, that game is sometimes not counted in his streak. MLB and the Society for American Baseball Research both credit Matsui with having played 519 consecutive MLB games.

Streak starts, continuations, and ends
Lou Gehrig's streak started as a pinch-hitter. The next day he started at first base in place of slumping Wally Pipp  and stayed there for fourteen years. On July 14, 1934, Gehrig, suffering from an attack of lumbago, was listed in the Yankee lineup at shortstop. He batted in the top of the first inning to preserve the streak, singled, and was promptly removed from the game.  Gehrig's streak was ended by amyotrophic lateral sclerosis, the disease that would take his life. His physical abilities rapidly declining, Gehrig told manager Joe McCarthy to take him out of the lineup on May 2, 1939. He never played again, dying in 1941.

Garvey's streak was ended when he dislocated his thumb in a home plate collision against the Atlanta Braves.

Scott's streak was ended when Manager Miller Huggins benched him in favor of Pee Wee Wanninger.

Ripken says that the closest he ever came to not playing during his streak was the day after he twisted his knee during a bench-clearing brawl against the Seattle Mariners in June 1993. When the 1994–95 player's strike threatened to destroy Ripken's streak as baseball owners planned to use replacement players, Baltimore owner Peter Angelos announced that the Orioles would rather not field a team than see Ripken's streak snapped. The replacement player scenario never came to pass, as the remainder of the 1994 season—including the World Series—was cancelled due to the strike. Ripken broke Gehrig's record on September 6, 1995. Ripken himself made the decision not to play on September 20, 1998, the Orioles' last home game of the season. Rookie Ryan Minor played third base for Ripken in a 5–4 loss to the Yankees. Ripken's record is considered by many to be unbreakable.

Miguel Tejada's streak ended after Doug Brocail hit Tejada on the wrist with a pitch on June 20, 2007. During the game on June 21, Tejada took an at-bat in the top half of the first inning, bunting into a fielder's choice. He was removed from the game for a pinch runner, officially keeping the streak alive. But Tejada was then diagnosed with a broken wrist and went to the disabled list, ending his streak at 1,152 games.

Consecutive innings
From June 5, 1982, to September 14, 1987, Ripken played 8,264 consecutive innings, which is believed to be a record, although not one that is officially kept by MLB. The second-longest streak known to have occurred is 5,152 consecutive innings by George Pinkney from 1885 to 1890.

Combined Japanese–US streak
Hideki Matsui assembled a consecutive games streak of 1,769 games combined between the Japanese league Yomiuri Giants and the Major league New York Yankees. If games in Japan were counted, this would place Matsui behind only Ripken and Gehrig for streaks in Major League Baseball, although other streaks that took place solely in Japan have been longer (Sachio Kinugasa's streak of 2,215 games, which was a world record until broken by Ripken, as well as Takashi Toritani's streak of 1,939 games.)  The MLB portion of Matsui's streak lasted for 519 games and is an MLB record for consecutive games to start a player's career. The entire combined streak stretched from August 22, 1993, to May 10, 2006, and was ended by a wrist injury sustained during what was his 519th consecutive game (see above). The MLB portion of the streak extended from March 31, 2003 (opening day), until May 10, 2006.

See also

Iron man (sports streak)

References

External links
CNNSI article on the end of Ripken's streak, including a picture of the lineup card

Games play
Consecutive Games Played Streaks